Michal Broš (born 25 January 1976) is a Czech former professional ice hockey forward who last played for HC Sparta Prague in the Czech Extraliga.

In his career Broš has won four Czech championships, in 1998 with HC Vsetin and in 1999, 2000 and 2002 with HC Sparta Prague and a Finnish championship in 2007 with Kärpät.  He also won the World Ice Hockey Championship in 2000 with the Czech Republic.

He was drafted 130th overall by the San Jose Sharks in the 1995 NHL Entry Draft, but never signed a contract with the team and remained in the Czech Extraliga.

Career statistics

Regular season and playoffs

International

External links
 

1976 births
Living people
Sportspeople from Olomouc
Czech ice hockey centres
HC Olomouc players
HC Sparta Praha players
VHK Vsetín players
Oulun Kärpät players
San Jose Sharks draft picks
BK Mladá Boleslav players
Czech expatriate ice hockey players in Finland